Piedone d'Egitto (internationally released as Flatfoot in Egypt and Flatfoot on the Nile) is a 1980 Italian "poliziottesco"-comedy film directed by Steno and starring Bud Spencer. It is the fourth and last chapter in the "Flatfoot" film series. It is preceded by Flatfoot, Flatfoot in Hong Kong and Flatfoot in Africa.

Plot 
The Neapolitan Commissioner Rizzo, said "Flatfoot", leaves to Egypt; a major Italian scientist has disappeared. The man in fact, before the kidnapping, was doing a research on the oil fields in Egypt, and a gang of criminals had put on his trail to get their hands on his projects. Flatfoot, who arrives in the land of the pharaohs, discovers that the scientist is kidnapped because he has realized that a particular beetle is attracted by land oilfields and nests on them. Now that the criminals have in hand the research of the scientist, Flatfoot sets out in search of them ...

Cast 
 Bud Spencer as Insp. 'Flatfoot' Rizzo 
 Enzo Cannavale as Caputo
 Baldwin Dakile as Bodo 
 Robert Loggia as Edward Burns
 Angelo Infanti as Hassan 
 Cinzia Monreale as Connie Burns
 Leopoldo Trieste as Professor Cerullo  
 Karl-Otto Alberty as The Swede
 Adel Adham as Elver Zakar
 Mahmoud Kabil as Lt. Kebir
 Riccardo Pizzuti as Salvatore Coppola
 Giovanni Cianfriglia

References

External links

1980 films
1980s crime comedy films
Italian crime comedy films
Films directed by Stefano Vanzina
Films scored by Guido & Maurizio De Angelis
Poliziotteschi films
1980s police comedy films
Films set in Egypt
1980 comedy films
1980s Italian films